Michal nad Žitavou is a village and municipality in the Nové Zámky District in the Nitra Region of south-west Slovakia.

History
In historical records the village was first mentioned in 1332.

Geography
The village lies at an altitude of 133 metres and covers an area of 8.189 km². It has a population of about 695 people.

Ethnicity
The population is about 99% Slovak.

Facilities
The village has a public library, a gym and football pitch.

References
 http://nitra.sme.sk/c/6147047/archeologovia-odhaluju-historiu-juhozapadneho-slovenska.html

External links
https://web.archive.org/web/20071027094149/http://www.statistics.sk/mosmis/eng/run.html
Michal nad Žitavou – Nové Zámky Okolie

Villages and municipalities in Nové Zámky District